The Broadway Madonna is a 1922 American silent drama film directed by Harry Revier and starring Dorothy Revier, Jack Connolly and Harry von Meter. It marked the screen debut of Dorothy Revier. Location shooting took place around San Francisco where the film is partly set. It was given a 1924 British release, where it was distributed by Wardour Films.

Cast
 Dorothy Revier as 	Vivian Collins
 Jack Connolly as 	Tom Bradshaw
 Harry von Meter as 	Dr. Kramer 
 Eugene Burr as 	Slinky Davis
 Juanita Hansen as Gloria Thomas
 Lee Willard as Judge Bradshaw
 Lydia Knott

References

Bibliography
 Munden, Kenneth White. The American Film Institute Catalog of Motion Pictures Produced in the United States, Part 1. University of California Press, 1997.

External links
 

1922 films
1922 drama films
American black-and-white films
American silent feature films
Films directed by Harry Revier
Film Booking Offices of America films
1920s English-language films
Films set in San Francisco
Films shot in San Francisco
1920s American films
Silent American drama films